Pre-revolutionary Imperial Russia (before 1917) did not have a single national unified system but instead relied on those provided by the manufacturers of the aircraft, like Sikorsky Ilya Muromets or Anatra Anasal.

Pre-war Soviet System
The Soviet system used from shortly after the revolution in 1923 and until gradually superseded after 1940, was divided by function, with numbers assigned in order by the government. Duplicate designations were common, as were multiple meanings for individual letters. Designers and manufacturers also had their own internal designations which could be confused for the official government designations. For instance, Tupolev's designs used the designator ANT, for A.N.Tupolev and Yakovlev's designs used AIR, for A.I.Rykov, the communist leader he reported to. Not all designations were taken up, some numbers were assigned to projects that were subsequently cancelled, often at a very early stage of development.

Type prefixes

(Cyrillic characters in parenthesis)
A (А) - Avtozhir (autogiro)
A-4 - TsAGI
A-7 - Kamov
ARK (AРК) - ARKtichyeskii (arctic = arctic exploration aircraft)
ARK-3 - Chyetverikov
ARK-4 - Chyetverikov
ARK-5 - Polikarpov R-5
B (Б) - Bombardirovshchik (bomber)  (Generic designation - not used for specific types)
BI (БИ) - Blitzniy Istrebitel (short/close-range fighter)
BI-1 - Bereznyak-Isayev
BB (ББ) - Blizhniy Bombardirovshchik (short-range bomber)
BB-1 - Sukhoi Su-2
BB-2 - Grushin
BB-22 - Yakovlev Yak-2
BB-22bis - Yakovlev Yak-4

BSh (БШ) - Bronirovannyi Shturmovik (Armored Ground Attack aircraft)
BSh-1 - Vultee V-11
BSh-2 - Ilyushin Il-2
DI (ДИ) - Dvukhmestnyi Istrebitel (two-seat fighter)
DI-1: Polikarpov 
DI-2: Polikarpov 
DI-3: Grigorovich
DI-4: Laville
DI-6: Kochyerigin/TsKB-11
DI-8: Tupolev ANT-46/Tupolev SB
DIP (ДИП) - Dvukhmotorny Istrebitel Pushechny (twin engine cannon fighter)
DIP: Tupolev ANT-29

DB (ДБ) - Dalniy Bombardirovshchik (long-range bomber)
DB-1: Tupolev ANT-25
DB-2: Tupolev ANT-37
DB-3: Ilyushin TsKB-30, redesignated Il-4
DB-4: Ilyushin TsKB-56 (prototype only)
DB-240: Yermolayev, redesignated Yer-2
DB-A - Bolkhovitinov
DB-LK - Belyayev
FB (ФБ) - Frontovoy Bombardirovshchik (front-line bomber)
FB: Tupolev Tu-2
G (Г) - Gruzovoi (cargo, usually converted heavy bomber)
G-1: Tupolev TB-1 as transport
G-2: Tupolev TB-3 as transport
GST (ГСТ) - Gydro Samolyot Transportnyj (cargo hydroplane)
GST - Consolidated PBY Catalina
I (И) - Istrebitel (destroyer = fighter)
I-Z - Grigorovich
I-1 - Polikarpov 
I-1 - Grigorovich (duplicated designation)
I-2 - Grigorovich
I-3 - Polikarpov 
I-4 - Tupolev ANT-5 
I-5 - Polikarpov. Initially Tupolev I-5/ANT-12, later Polikarpov I-6 redesignated I-5.
I-6 - Polikarpov. Renamed to I-5 after winning competition with Tupolev I-5.
I-7 - Heinkel HD-37 (licensed-built German aircraft)
I-8 - Tupolev ANT-13 
I-9 - Grigorovich
I-10 - Grigorovich
I-11 - Polikarpov
I-12 - Tupolev ANT-23
I-13 - Polikarpov
I-14 - Tupolev ANT-31
I-15/I-15bis/I-153 - Polikarpov TsKB-3 
I-16 - Polikarpov TsKB-12/18/29
I-17 - Polikarpov TsKB-15/19/25/33
I-18 - Polikarpov TsKB-43 (unbuilt) 
I-21 - Ilyushin
I-21 - Pashinin
I-22 - Lavochkin-Gorbunov-Gudkov LaGG-1
I-26 - Yakovlev Yak-1. '26' is from Yakovlev AIR series designations.
I-28 - Yatsenko
I-29 - Yakovlev Yak-2
I-30 - Yakovlev Yak-1
I-33 - Yakovlev Yak-3

IP (ИП) - Istrebitel Pushetchnii (cannon fighter)
IP-1 - Grigorovich
IP-2 - Grigorovich
IP-4 - Grigorovich
IP-21 - Pashinin
IS (ИС) - Istrebitel Skladnoi (folding fighter)
IS-1 & IS-2 - Nikitin
K (K) - Korablennyi (shipborne) (Generic designation - not used for specific types)
KR (KР) - Korabelnii Razvedchik (shipboard reconnaissance)
KR-1 - Heinkel HD 55
KR-2 - Beriev Be-2/KOR-1  
KR (KР) - KReiser (cruiser = heavy long-range fighter)
KR-6 - Tupolev ANT-7/R-6 on floats
KOR (KOР) - Korabelnii O Razvedchik – (shipboard catapult reconnaissance)
KOR-1 - Beriev Be-2
KOR-2 - Beriev Be-4
KOR-3 - Beriev Be-5, not built
LBSh (ЛБШ) - Lyogki Bronirovannyi Shturmovik (light armoured-attack)
LBSh - KochyeriginM (М) - Morskoi (marine = seaplane) (Generic designation - not used for specific types)MBR (МБР) - Morskoi Blizhnii Razvedchik (short-range reconnaissance seaplane)MBR-1 - Bartini project
MBR-2 - Beriev MP-1
MBR-3 - Samsonov
MBR-4 - Savoia-Marchetti SM.62bis
MBR-5 - Samsonov
MBR-7 - Beriev MS-8MDR (МДР) - Morskoi Dalnii Razvedchik (long-range reconnaissance seaplane)MDR-1 - Grigorovich ROM-2
MDR-2 - Tupolev ANT-8
MDR-3 - Chyetverikov TsKB-11
MDR-4 - Tupolev ANT-27, later MTB-1
MDR-5 - Beriev MS-5
MDR-6 - Chyetverikov Che-2
MDR-7 - Shavrov
MDR-10 - BerievMDRT (МДРТ) - Morskoi Dalnii Razvedchik Torpedonosets (long-range reconnaissance seaplane torpedo bomber)MDRT - BerievMI (МИ) - Mnogomestnii Istrebitel (multi-seat fighter)MI-3 - Tupolev ANT-21MP (МП) - Morskoi Passazhirskiy (passenger seaplane)MP-1 - Beriev MBR-2
MP-2 - Chyetverikov ARK-3MR (МР) - Morskoi Razvedchik (reconnaissance seaplane)MR-1 - Polikarpov R-1 on floats
MR-2 - Grigorovich
MR-3 - OMOS
MR-3 - Grigorovich
MR-5 - Grigorovich
MR-5 - Polikarpov R-5 on floats
MR-6 - TupolevMTB (МТБ) - Morskoi Torpedonosyets Bombardirovshchik (naval torpedo bomber)
MTB-1 - Tupolev ANT-27
MTB-2 - Tupolev ANT-44
MU (МУ) - Morskoi Uchebny (seaplane trainer)
MU-1 - Avro 504 
MU-2 - Polikarpov U-2M
MU-3 - Moskaleyev
MU-4 - Nikitin
PS (ПС) - Passazhirskii Samolyot (passenger aircraft or airliner)
PS-3 - Tupolev R-3
PS-3 - Junkers W 33
PS-4 - Junkers W 33
PS-5 - Nyeman/Kharkov R-10
PS-7 - Tupolev ANT-7
PS-9 - Tupolev ANT-9
PS-30 - Martin 156
PS-35 - Tupolev ANT-35
PS-40 - Tupolev SB
PS-41 - Tupolev SB
PS-42 - Petlyakov Pe-8
PS-43 - Vultee V-11
PS-84 - Lisunov Li-2/Douglas DC-3
PS-89 - Laville ZIG-1
PS-124 - Tupolev ANT-20bis
R (Р) - Razvedchik (Reconnaissance)
R-Z - Polikarpov
R-1 - Polikarpov
R-2 - Polikarpov
R-3 - Tupolev ANT-3
R-4 - Tupolev (prototype only)
R-5 - Polikarpov
R-6 - Tupolev ANT-7
R-7 - Tupolev ANT-10 (prototype only)
R-9 - Kochyerigin R-9/SR-9
R-10 - Neman/KhAI
R-12 - Yakovlev (prototype only)
RD (РД) - Rekord Dalnost  – (long range record aircraft)
RD - Tupolev ANT-25
ROM (РOМ) - Razvedchik Otkrytogo Morya (reconnaissance open sea)
ROM-1 - Grigorovich
ROM-2 - Grigorovich
SB (СБ) - Skorostnoi Bombardirovshchik (high-speed bomber)
SB: Tupolev ANT-40
ShB (ШБ) - Shturmovoi Bombardirovshchik (attack bomber)
ShB: Sukhoi Su-2
SPB (СПБ) - Skorostnoi Pikiruyuschii Bombardirovshchik (high-speed dive bomber)
SPB - Polikarpov I-16 variant used with Zveno project
SPL (СПЛ) - Samolyet dlya Podvodnikh Lodok (aeroplane for submarines)
SPL - Chyetverikov
SS (СС) - Stratosfernii Samolyot (stratospheric aircraft)
SS - Chizhevski BOK-1
T (Т) - Torpedonosets (Torpedo bomber)
T-1 - Tupolev ANT-41
TB (ТБ) - Tiazholyi Bombardirovshchik (heavy bomber)
TB-1 - Tupolev ANT-4
TB-2 - Polikarpov (prototype only)
TB-3 - Tupolev ANT-6 
TB-4 - Tupolev ANT-16
TB-5 - Grigorovich
TB-6 - Tupolev ANT-26 
TB-7 - Tupolev ANT-42 (redesignated Pe-8)

TSh (ТШ) - Tiazholyi Shturmovik (heavy ground attack aircraft)
TSh-1 - Grigorovich (modified Polikarpov R-5)
TSh-2 - Grigorovich (modified Polikarpov R-5)
TSh-3 - Kocherigin TsKB-4
U (У) - Uchebny (trainer)
U-1 - Avro 504 
U-2 - Polikarpov U-2/Po-2
U-3 - Mikhelson
U-4 - Mikhelson
U-5 - Nikitin NV-5
UPB (УПБ) - Uchyebno Perekhodnoi Bombardirovshchik (training transitional bomber)
UPB - Kazan KAI-3
UT (УТ) - Uchebno-Trenirivochnyi (advanced trainer)
UT-1 - Yakovlev UT-1
UT-2 - Yakovlev UT-2
UT-3 - Yakovlev UT-3

UTI (УТИ) - Uchebno-Trenirivochnyi Istrebitel (advanced fighter trainer)
UTI-1 - Polikarpov I-15 as fighter trainer
UTI-2 - Polikarpov I-16 as fighter trainer
UTI-3 - Polikarpov I-16 as fighter trainer
UTI-4 - Polikarpov I-16UTI fighter trainer
UTI-5 - Nikitin NV-2
UTI-6 - Nikitin NV-4
UTI-26 - Yakovlev Yak-1/Yak-7
VIT (ВИТ) - Vozdushnyi Istrebitel Tankov (air tank destroyer)
VIT-1 - Polikarpov
VIT-2 - Polikarpov

Soviet system after December 9, 1940
The system after December 9, 1940 (in accordance with order No 704) used letter abbreviations for the design office, 
then sequential numbers, sometimes with odd numbers for fighters (e.g. Yak-3, MiG-15, Su-27...) and even numbers for other types (e.g. Il-2, Tu-16, Su-34, Tu-154...). However, this latter rule was not always applied, especially for helicopters.

Contrary to western sources, official Soviet designations did not include constructors' names (e.g. Yakovlev Yak-1), only abbreviations (i.e. Yak-1) however initially full names like Yakovlev-1 were occasionally used. Numerical designations were assigned individually for each developer to aircraft when they entered service. Aircraft also frequently had development designations used within design bureaus, like aircraft 105, or ANT-105 that led to the Tu-22, or T-6 for Su-24, and an industry production name assigned to the facility where production was undertaken.

The NATO Air Standardization Coordinating Committee reporting name system (used because designations of new types were often unknown to NATO) was based on an initial letter indicating type of aircraft (B = bomber, C = cargo, F = fighter, H = helicopter, M = miscellaneous) or missile, and 1 syllable if propeller-driven or 2 if jet- or rocket-powered.

Design Office Prefixes
An (Ан): Antonov
Ar (Ар): Archangelski
BI (БИ): Berezniak-Isaev

Be (Бе): Beriev
Che (Че): Chetverikov
Gu (Гу): Gudkov
Il (Ил): Ilyushin
Ka (Ка): Kamov
La (Ла): Lavochkin
LaG (ЛаГ): Lavochkin-Gorbunov
LaGG (ЛаГГ): Lavochkin-Gorbunov-Gudkov
Li (Ли): Lisunov
M (М): Myasishchev
Mi (Ми): Mil
MiG (МиГ): Mikoyan-Gurevich, until the death of Artem Mikoyan in 1970, then just Mikoyan
Pe (Пе): Petlyakov
Po (По): Polikarpov
Su (Су): Sukhoi
Sh (Ш): Shavrov
Shche (Ще): Shcherbakov
Ta (Та): Tairov 
Ts (Ц): Tsybin
Tu (Ту): Tupolev (bureau designation was ANT)
Yak (Як): Yakovlev (bureau designation was AIR)
Yer (Ер): Yermolayev

See also
List of military aircraft of the Soviet Union and the CIS

References

External links
List of aircraft names at aviation.ru

Soviet Air Force
Military aircraft designation systems